SU Soccer Stadium is a 1,500 seat soccer-specific stadium on the campus of Syracuse University in Syracuse, New York. The facility is home to the Syracuse Orange men's and women's soccer programs. The stadium opened in 1996 and is located behind the Manley Field House.

References

External links 
 SU Soccer Stadium

College soccer venues in the United States
Soccer venues in New York (state)
Sports venues in Syracuse, New York
Syracuse Orange sports venues
Stadium
1996 establishments in New York (state)
Sports venues completed in 1996